China–Peru relations are foreign relations between the People's Republic of China and the Republic of Peru. Peru is the first Latin American country that China established formal ties with, which was done by the Qing dynasty in August 1875. Both nations are members of the Asia-Pacific Economic Cooperation and the United Nations.

Relations between both nations went through three stages: Chinese coolieism as an institutionalization of human capital export to Latin America during the nineteenth century; the Maoist ideology transfer in the 1970s and 1980s; and, from the 1990s onwards, through international trade and cultural and Mandarin language centers—the Confucius Institute.

History

Origins
Relations were established more than 160 years ago, intertwined with local social imageries, power structure, and narratives. Peru established relations with the Qing dynasty with the signing of a treaty in Tianjin on June 26, 1874. Peru's first Resident Ambassador was named the next year, assuming his duties on May 20, 1878, while the Chinese ambassador would only reach Peru in 1883, after the War of the Pacific. Relations between both states started with the Coolie Trade and matured during the ‘Hundred Years weakness and poverty’ (Wang, 1993) from the 1840s to 1949 of the impoverished Qing China, followed by a republic divided by civil wars and invaded by Japan.

After the establishment of the Republic of China, Peru maintained its relations with the new Kuomintang government. In 1944, the diplomatic status of the two countries was raised to embassy level, and high-level officials of the two countries exchanged frequent visits in the 1950s and 1960s. As a result of the Chinese Civil War, Peru closed its embassy in Beijing in 1946.

Relations since 1971
After the establishment of Juan Velasco Alvarado's Revolutionary Government, Peru established relations with the People's Republic of China on November 2, 1971, with the Republic of China severing its relations and closing its embassy in Lima as a result, and the PRC opening its embassy the following year. As such, Peru became the third Latin American country to recognize the Beijing-based government. Since the establishment of relations between Peru and the PRC, the South American country has adhered to the One China policy.

In May 1978, the ROC established the "Far East Trade Center" in Lima to promote bilateral trade. On November 5, 1990, President Alberto Fujimori approved Supreme Executive Order No. RE014, agreeing to change the name of "Far East Trade Center" to "Taipei Economic and Cultural Office in Peru". On March 3, 1994, Peru established a "Taipei Trade Office" in Taiwan.

Peru and the PRC signed a free trade agreement in April 2009. The agreement was officially ratified by both countries governments on December 6, 2009, and came into effect on March 1, 2010.

Resident diplomatic missions
 China has an embassy in Lima.
 Peru has an embassy in Beijing and consulates-general in Guangzhou, Hong Kong, and Shanghai.

See also
List of ambassadors of China to Peru
List of ambassadors of Peru to China
China–Peru Free Trade Agreement

References

Bibliography